A fanlight is a form of lunette window, often semicircular or semi-elliptical in shape,  with glazing bars or tracery sets radiating out like an open fan. It is placed over another window or a doorway, and is sometimes hinged to a transom. The bars  in the fixed glazed window spread out in the manner of a sunburst. It is also called a "sunburst light".

Gallery

See also 
 Lunette

References

External links 

 Doorways around the World

Glass architecture
Windows